Westmorland and Furness Council is the future local authority for Westmorland and Furness in the north-west of England. It is a unitary authority, having the powers of a non-metropolitan county and district council combined. Westmorland and Furness Council will replace Cumbria County Council, Barrow-in-Furness Borough Council, Eden District Council and South Lakeland District Council, on 1 April 2023.

Politics

Westmorland and Furness has 65 councillors, It was first elected in May 2022 and will operate as a shadow authority until taking up its powers on 1 April 2023.

Composition
At the 2022 council election, the Liberal Democrats secured a majority on the incoming council with 36 out of 65 councillors. Labour will have 15 councillors, the Conservatives will have 11 councillors, the Green Party will have 1 councillor and 2 councillors were elected as independents.

Composition of predecessor bodies
The combined composition of the three merging Borough councils going into that election was as follows:

References

External links
Westmorland and Furness Council - Official website
Westmorland and Furness Council - Official Twitter feed

Local education authorities in England
Local authorities in Cumbria
Unitary authority councils of England